Abdulla Ali Mohammad Al Kamali (born December 9, 1989, in Dubai), or simply Abdulla, is an Emirati football striker. He currently plays for Al Sharjah SC in the UAE Football League.

Al Kamali made his professional debut for Al Wasl in UAE League, being the top goalscorer of the reserves league. He scored 18 goals for the UAE national under-20 football team, and five goals for the UAE national under-18 football team during the 2007-2008 season.

Career

Atlético Paranaense
He is the first UAE player and second from the Arab world, after Khaled Kharroubi of Algeria, to have signed a professional contract with a first division football club in the Brazilian league.

Al-Ahli
He joined Al-Ahli in 2009. And before the beginning of the 2010-11 season he was released from the club as per the coach David O'Leary recommendation.

Career  Statistics

Club

1Continental competitions include the AFC Champions League
2Other tournaments include the UAE President Cup and Etisalat Emirates Cup, FIFA Club World Cup

References

External links
Official website
 CBF

1989 births
Living people
Sportspeople from Dubai
Emirati footballers
Emirati expatriate footballers
Al-Wasl F.C. players
Al Ahli Club (Dubai) players
Sharjah FC players
Expatriate footballers in Brazil
Emirati expatriate sportspeople in Brazil
Club Athletico Paranaense players
UAE Pro League players
Association football forwards